Michael Sandstød (born 23 June 1968) is a Danish former professional racing cyclist, who achieved success on both the road and track. Sandstød represented Denmark at the 1992 Summer Olympics, where he rode in the qualification round of the team pursuit where he won a bronze medal.

Palmarès

Track cycling

Road

References

External links 

1968 births
Living people
Cyclists at the 1992 Summer Olympics
Cyclists at the 2000 Summer Olympics
Danish male cyclists
Olympic bronze medalists for Denmark
Olympic cyclists of Denmark
Cyclists from Copenhagen
Danish track cyclists
Olympic medalists in cycling
Medalists at the 1992 Summer Olympics